Roman Olegovich Volobuev (Russian: Роман Олегович Волобуев; born July 31, 1977, Moscow, Soviet Union) is a Russian film and television director, writer, producer, and former film critic. Volobuev is best known for his 8-year tenure as film reviewer at Afisha magazine and for writing and directing TV series The Last Minister and Just Imagine Things We Know.

Early life and media career 
Born and raised in Moscow, Volobuev briefly worked as an investigative reporter at Obshaya Gazeta before starting to write film reviews for the Russian edition of Première magazine, Izvestia, Vedomosti and Iskusstvo Kino and in 2004 became a film section editor at Afisha. He also served as founding editor-in-chief of the short-lived Russian edition of Empire film magazine in 2007 and as deputy editor of GQ Russia in 2012.

Film an TV career 
In 2013, Volobuev and his co-writer Lena Vanina developed a political comedy series Zavtra (Tomorrow) about Russian liberal opposition winning presidential election for an independent cable news station TV Rain. Only pilot episode was produced, since TV Rain ran into political and financial troubles and could no longer finance the show. Volobuev's debut feature film The Cold Front (2016) a chamber mystery drama shot in Normandy was met with mostly lukewarm reviews and failed at the Russian box-office. His second film a satirical action comedy Blokbaster (2017) fared much better with critics and received the Special Jury Prize at Kinotavr film festival, but was disowned by Volobuev after a public spat with producers over the final cut. He eventually found a mainstream success with the black political comedy TV series The Last Minister and a 4-part mini-series about Moscow media industry Just Imagine Things We Know both released in 2020. Volobuev also co-wrote a post-apocalyptic drama series Survivors (2021) and appeared as an actor in Valeriya Gai Germanika's Brief Guide To A Happy Life (2011), Boris Khlebnikov's Hot and Bothered (2015) and Konstantin Bogomolov's A Good Man (2020).

Political views 
Volobuev is highly critical of Russian authorities, once calling modern Russia "an authoritarian state with good Wi-Fi and a nice urban planning". He was a vocal supporter of Snow Revolution and has been detained during street protests in Moscow in 2012. In 2018, after the arrest of the fellow director Kirill Serebrennikov he publicly urged Russian filmmakers to stop applying for funding from Russia's Ministry of Culture.

In 2022, Volobuev condemned the Russian invasion of Ukraine and subsequently left Russia. In a manifesto published by Meduza he compared moral choices Russian filmmakers currently face to the ones German filmmakers faced under Hitler.

Filmography 
Source: Kinopoisk

Feature films

Television

Bibliography 
 500 фильмов изменивших мир (500 films that changed the word). 2006, Afisha Industries. 432 pages. .

References

External links 
 
Roman Volobuev at Mubi
Roman Volobuev at KinoPoisk

1977 births
Living people
Russian film critics
Russian film directors
Russian film editors
Russian screenwriters
Russian activists against the 2022 Russian invasion of Ukraine